The College of Arts and Sciences, is a liberal arts college of the University of Cincinnati. Located in the university's main campus in Cincinnati, Ohio, the college is commonly referred to as Arts and Sciences or simply A&S. As the largest and most diverse college, A&S is the academic heart of the University of Cincinnati and home to twenty-one departments, eight co-op programs, several interdisciplinary programs, and 407 full-time faculty members.

Name

The college was formally named after Charles McMicken because his donation of land helped found the university. In December 2019, the university's Board of Trustees voted to remove McMicken's name from the college because he had been a slaveowner. The name was removed from the rest of campus in June, 2022.

Programs

The college offers 55 undergraduate majors, 22 masters programs, and 14 doctoral programs. Enrollment comprises over 6,000 undergraduate students and over 800 graduate students. The college also offers a number of "4+1" programs where students complete their bachelor's and master's degree continuously in 5 years.

Undergraduate

Graduate

Centers & Institutes
Center for Biosensors & Chemical Sensors
Center for Geospatial Information & Environmental Sensor Network (GIESN)
Center for Organizational Leadership
Charles Phelps Taft Research Center
University of Cincinnati Center for Field Studies
Cognition, Action and Perception Center (CAP)
Kunz Center for Social Research

References

External links
UC's College of Arts and Sciences official site

University of Cincinnati
Liberal arts colleges at universities in the United States